Delaware's 8th Senate district is one of 21 districts in the Delaware Senate. It has been represented by Democrat David Sokola since 1990.

Geography
District 8 is based in Newark – the state's third-largest city – and also covers parts of Hockessin and North Star.

Like all districts in the state, the 8th Senate district is located entirely within Delaware's at-large congressional district. It overlaps with the 12th, 21st, 22nd, 23rd, and 25th districts of the Delaware House of Representatives. The district borders Maryland to the west and Pennsylvania along the Twelve-Mile Circle.

Recent election results
Delaware Senators are elected to staggered four-year terms. Under normal circumstances, the 8th district holds elections in presidential years, except immediately after redistricting, when all seats are up for election regardless of usual cycle.

2020

2016

2012

Federal and statewide results in District 8

References 

8
New Castle County, Delaware